Scott Handcock  (born 8 November 1984) is an English writer, director and producer who has been involved in a number of audio plays for Big Finish Productions, the audio production company perhaps best associated with the Doctor Who franchise.

Handcock has attended fan conventions in New York City, Swansea, California, Germany, and recently worked for BBC Wales as a production runner on the third and fourth series of Doctor Who Confidential, the animated Doctor Who adventure The Infinite Quest, and the second series of The Sarah Jane Adventures. Most recently, he has worked on the sixth series of Doctor Who, beginning with Matt Smith's first Christmas special, "A Christmas Carol", and directed The Confessions of Dorian Gray series for  Big Finish Productions. He has also contributed features to the official Doctor Who Magazine.

Audio dramas 
Dark Shadows: The Book of Temptation (released September 2006)
Bernice Summerfield: The Oracle of Delphi (released November 2006)
Dark Shadows: The Christmas Presence (released January 2007)
Dark Shadows: The Skin Walkers (released November 2008)
Doctor Who: The Magician's Oath (released April 2009)
Gallifrey: Annihilation with Gary Russell (released March 2011)
Bernice Summerfield: Judgement Day (released September 2011)
Dark Shadows: Speak No Evil (released August 2012)
Bernice Summerfield: Shades of Gray (released September 2012)
Bernice Summerfield: Many Happy Returns with Xanna Eve Chown, Stephen Cole, Paul Cornell, Stephen Fewell, Simon Guerrier, Rebecca Levene, Jacqueline Rayner, Justin Richards, Miles Richardson, Eddie Robson and Dave Stone (released November 2012)
The Confessions of Dorian Gray: The Heart That Lives Alone (released November 2012)
The Confessions of Dorian Gray: Running Away With You (released August 2013)
Gallifrey: Extermination  (released October 2013)
Bernice Summerfield: In Living Memory with Gary Russell (released December 2013)
The Confessions of Dorian Gray: Displacement Activity (released November 2014)
The Confessions of Dorian Gray: The Darkest Hour (released November 2014)
Gallifrey: Intervention Earth with David Llewellyn (released February 2015)
Iris Wildthyme: An Extraterrestrial Werewolf in Belgium (released August 2015)

Talking books 
Dark Shadows: The Skin Walkers (released November 2008)
Doctor Who: The Magician's Oath (released April 2009)
Doctor Who: The Rising Night (released July 2009)
The Sarah Jane Adventures: The Shadow People (released October 2009)
Doctor Who: Snake Bite (released December 2012)

Short stories 
Attachments in Short Trips: Snapshots (2007; edited by Joseph Lidster)
They Fell in Short Trips: The Ghosts of Christmas (2007; edited by Cavan Scott & Mark Wright)
The Midnight Washerwomen in Iris: Abroad (Obverse Books 2010, edited by Paul Magrs and Stuart Douglas
Platform Alteration in The Obverse Book of Ghosts (Obverse Books 2010, edited by Cavan Scott

Acting 
The Oracle of Delphi (released November 2006) Plato
I, Davros: Innocence (released September 2006) Kaled Officer
I, Davros: Guilt (released December 2006) Thal Saboteur/Castan/Computer Voice
Iris Wildthyme 2.1: The Sound of Fear (released February 2009) Mohanalee
Iris Wildthyme 2.2: Land of Wonder (released March 2009) The White Rabbit
Iris Wildthyme 2.3: The Two Irises (released April 2009) Barry
Iris Wildthyme and the Claws of Santa (released November 2009) Alfredo
Gallifrey: Reborn (released March 2011) Jevon
Gallifrey: Disassembled (released March 2011) Jevon
Gallifrey: Annihilation (released March 2011) Vekken
Gallifrey: Forever (released March 2011) Jevon
Doctor Who: Love and War (released October 2012) Piers Gavenal

Handcock is also credited as an extra on miscellaneous Big Finish audio dramas.

Television credits 
Doctor Who Confidential, series 3–4 (2007–08) – production runner
That Life (2007) – production runner
Doctor Who: The Infinite Quest (2007) – production runner
The Sarah Jane Adventures, series 2 (2008) – production runner
Doctor Who, series 6 (2011) – production secretary

References

External links 

1984 births
English writers
Living people
People from Birmingham, West Midlands
English LGBT writers